This is a list of museums in Quebec City, Canada.  Also included are non-profit art galleries and university art galleries.  Museums that exist only in cyberspace (i.e., virtual museums) are not included.

 See also List of museums in Montreal for museums in the Montreal region.
 See also List of museums in Quebec for museums in the rest of the province.

Museums

Defunct museums
 Quebec Wax Museum (Musée de Cire), closed in 2007, figures now at the Musée de la civilisation

References

Bonjour Quebec
Société des musées québécois

 
Quebec City
Quebec City
Quebec City
Museums in Quebec City